This Time Around is the second studio album by American pop rock group Hanson, released in 2000. Although Hanson had several albums in between, This Time Around is their first standard studio release since 1997's Middle of Nowhere. This Time Around did not achieve the commercial success of its predecessor Middle of Nowhere. The album does not feature as many bubblegum pop style tunes as Middle of Nowhere; instead, Hanson opted to focus on a more classic rock sound, or as MTV.com stated, "stadium rock". The album also features numerous ballads, with songs such as "Sure About It" and "A Song to Sing" covering the themes of teenage insecurity and loneliness, much like "Weird" from Middle of Nowhere. Critically, This Time Around received mainly positive reviews. To date, it has sold over one million copies worldwide.

Critical reception

Critically, This Time Around received mainly positive reviews. It was given a score of 67 out of 100 by Metacritic. Billboard said, "It all adds up to a collection that successfully sets Hanson apart from the current teen-pop phenomenon that it helped start -- at least from a creative perspective," and CDNow said "This Time Around scores with more sophisticated harmonies and storytelling." Rolling Stone said, "Like a blond three-headed hydra, Hanson loom over the competition, making all other teen idols sound like Gerber-sucking clowns." AllMusic said, "It's hard not to miss the thrilling way Middle of Nowhere leapt out of the speakers upon its first spin with giddy fun, yet with its carefully considered craft and warmly ingratiating pop songs This Time Around is winning entertainment." However, not everyone was complimentary about the change in musical style, with Robert Christgau of The Village Voice stating "If you thought they were bad when they were cute, or even that they were cute when they were good, believe me, you don't want to hear them mature," and NME with the even harsher verdict: "But damn those cruel hormones – Hanson's collective balls have MmmDropped, and the giddy rush of adolescence seeks to mutate Mercury's finest investment into a trio of crack-voiced hulks."

Singles
"If Only" was released as the lead single outside the United States on April 3, 2000. The song features John Popper of the band Blues Traveler on harmonica. The music video features the group traveling in a desert on their tour bus, unloading their equipment to shoot the video. The song reached the top 10 in Australia, Finland, Italy, and Spain and entered the charts of other European countries.
"This Time Around" was released on April 4, 2000, as the lead single in the United States and Canada, peaking at number 20 on the Billboard Hot 100. The song was also released in Australia as the second single.
"Save Me" was released on July 15 only in United Kingdom and Brazil. The song was included in the soundtrack to the Brazilian soap opera Laços de Família (Family Ties).

Track listing
All songs written by Isaac Hanson, Taylor Hanson and Zac Hanson.Lead vocals by Taylor Hanson, except where noted.

 "You Never Know" – 3:04
 "If Only" – 4:30
 "This Time Around" – 4:17 (Lead vocals: Taylor and Isaac Hanson)
 "Runaway Run" – 3:40
 "Save Me" – 3:40
 "Dying to Be Alive" – 4:37
 "Can't Stop" – 4:24
 "Wish That I Was There" – 3:32 (Lead vocals: Zac and Taylor Hanson)
 "Love Song" – 4:06 (Lead vocals: Isaac Hanson)
 "Sure About It" – 3:27
 "Hand in Hand" – 4:37 (Lead vocals: Isaac Hanson)
 "In the City" – 3:27
 "A Song to Sing" – 3:35 [hidden track] (Lead vocals: Taylor and Isaac Hanson)

In some locales two additional hidden tracks, "Smile" and "Lonely Again", were also included in the foreign version of the CD. Just like Middle of Nowhere, "A Song to Sing" is track 21 with eight tracks of silence used once again, despite some reissues dropping the silent tracks to make "A Song to Sing" track 13. 58:22

Personnel

Hanson
Taylor Hanson – piano, keyboards, harmonica, percussion, vocals
Isaac Hanson – electric and acoustic guitars, vocals
Zachary Hanson – drums, vocals

Additional personnel
John Popper, Scott Gordon – harmonica
Jonny Lang – electric guitars
Stephen Lironi – electric guitars, organ, bass, loops
Kevin Wyatt – bass
Abe Laboriel, Jr. – drums, percussion
Ged Lynch – percussion
DJ Swamp – DJ/scratching
Michael Fisher – percussion
Rose Stone (also director), Lisa Banks, Alfie Silas, Carolyn, Darlene, Sharon & Lori Petty, Howard McCreary, Rick Riso, Cedric Johns – choir
Joel Derouin – violin
David Campbell – viola
Larry Corbett – cello
Strings on "Runaway Run" arranged by David Campbell

Production
Arranged by Hanson
Produced by Hanson and Stephen Lironi; vocals produced by Hanson and Mark Hudson
Recording engineers – Scott Gordon (vocal engineer), Doug Trantow, Steve Churchyard ("You Never Know")
Second engineers – Annette Cisneros, Pat Burkholder, Brent Riley, Eric Ferguson, Dave Dominguez, Elan Trujillo
Additional Pro Tools engineering by Lars Fox
Mixed by Tom Lord-Alge
Mastered at Sterling Sound

Charts

Certifications

References

External links
 

Hanson (band) albums
2000 albums
Albums produced by Mark Hudson (musician)
Island Records albums